William F. "Bill" Garrison (born 27 June 1944) is a retired major general  of the United States Army who commanded United States forces during Operation Gothic Serpent, the military operation launched in 1993 to capture Somali warlord Mohamed Farrah Aidid.

Early life and education
Garrison was born in Mineral Wells, Texas, on 27 June 1944. He earned his Bachelor of Business Administration degree from University of Texas–Pan American. Garrison enlisted in the United States Army in 1966.

Military career
During the Vietnam War, Garrison participated in the Phoenix Program. According to Mark Bowden, Garrison "had served two tours in Vietnam, part of it helping to run the infamously brutal Phoenix Program, which ferreted out and killed Viet Cong village leaders."

From 1981 to 1983, Garrison commanded the 1st Battalion, 505th Infantry, 82d Airborne Division, at Fort Bragg. In 1982 he led an 808-man task force, TF 1/505, on the first six-month Sinai mission as part of the Multinational Force and Observers, serving as a buffer between Israel and Egypt, and was present when Israel handed over the Sinai to Egypt. Garrison spent most of his career in special operations units, including the Intelligence Support Activity as the commander of its operations squadron and the 1st Special Forces Operational Detachment-Delta (also known as Delta Force) from 1985 to 1989. His last command was the John F. Kennedy Special Warfare Center.

Operation Gothic Serpent
Garrison commanded Task Force Ranger during Operation Gothic Serpent in Somalia, a military operation conducted in Mogadishu, Somalia, by an American-led coalition during the Somali Civil War in 1993. The primary objective of the operation was to capture Somali military officer Mohamed Farrah Aidid, who was wanted by the Unified Task Force after his attacks against United Nations troops in 1992. The operation took place from August to October 1993 and was supervised by the United States' Joint Special Operations Command (JSOC).

The mission ultimately culminated in what became known as the 1993 Battle of Mogadishu. Garrison took full responsibility for the tactical setbacks experienced in Operation Gothic Serpent, which effectively ended his military career.

Mark Bowden, the author of Black Hawk Down: A Story of Modern War, described Garrison as a military ascetic. According to Bowden's description Garrison tirelessly worked to serve his country and would do anything for his soldiers. Some of Garrison's subordinates have also spoken publicly about their former commander. Staff Sergeant Dan Schilling, an Air Force Combat Controller who took part in Operation Gothic Serpent, shared his feelings about Garrison in the book:

By September 1996, Garrison had retired at the rank of major general and settled into a ranch near the community of Hico, Texas.

Military awards

In popular culture
 Garrison is portrayed by Sam Shepard in the film Black Hawk Down, which was based on the events of the Battle of Mogadishu.

References

Further reading
 Bowden, Mark (March 1999). Black Hawk Down: A Story of Modern War. Atlantic Monthly Press. Berkeley, California (U.S.). 
 Boykin, William (Lt.Gen.) (2008). Never Surrender. Faith Words. New York, New York. .
 Eversmann, Matthew and Dan Schilling, eds. (2006). The Battle of Mogadishu: Firsthand Accounts From The Men of Task Force Ranger.
 Smith, Michael (2006). Killer Elite: The Inside Story of America's Most Secret Special Operations Team. Cassell. London.  online presentation
 Wasdin, Howard E. (2011). Seal Team Six: Memoirs of an Elite Navy SEAL Sniper. St. Martin's Press. New York, New York. .

External links

1944 births
Living people
University of Texas–Pan American alumni
Sam Houston State University alumni
United States Army generals
Battle of Mogadishu (1993)
Recipients of the Air Medal
Recipients of the Legion of Merit
Recipients of the Defense Distinguished Service Medal
Delta Force
People from Mineral Wells, Texas
People from Hico, Texas
Recipients of the Humanitarian Service Medal
Military personnel from Texas